Christian feminism is a school of Christian theology which seeks to advance and understand the equality of men and women morally, socially, spiritually, and in leadership from a Christian perspective. Christian feminists argue that contributions by women, and an acknowledgment of women's value, are necessary for a complete understanding of Christianity. Christian feminists believe that God does not discriminate on the basis of biologically-determined characteristics such as sex and race, but created all humans to exist in harmony and equality, regardless of race or gender. Christian feminists generally advocate for anti-essentialism as a part of their belief system, acknowledging that gender identities do not mandate a certain set of personality traits. Their major issues include the ordination of women, biblical equality in marriage, recognition of equal spiritual and moral abilities, abortion rights, integration of gender neutral pronouns within readings of the Bible, and the search for a feminine or gender-transcendent divine. Christian feminists often draw on the teachings of other religions and ideologies in addition to biblical evidence, and other Christian based texts throughout history that advocate for women's rights.

The term Christian egalitarianism is often preferred by those advocating gender equality and equity among Christians who do not wish to associate themselves with the feminist movement.

History 

Some Christian feminists believe that the principle of egalitarianism was present in the teachings of Jesus and the early Christian movements such as Marianismo, but this is a highly contested view by many feminist scholars who believe that Christianity itself relies heavily on gender roles.  These interpretations of Christian origins have been criticized by secular feminists for "anachronistically projecting contemporary ideals back into the first century." In the Middle Ages Julian of Norwich and Hildegard of Bingen explored the idea of a divine power with both masculine and feminine characteristics. Feminist works from the fifteenth to seventeenth centuries addressed objections to women learning, teaching and preaching in a religious context. One such proto-feminist was Anne Hutchinson who was cast out of the Puritan colony of Massachusetts for teaching on the dignity and rights of women.

The first wave of feminism in the nineteenth and early twentieth centuries included an increased interest in the place of women in religion. Women who were campaigning for their rights began to question their inferiority both within the church and in other spheres, which had previously been justified by church teachings. Some Christian feminists of this period were Marie Maugeret, Katharine Bushnell, Catherine Booth, Frances Willard, and Elizabeth Cady Stanton.

During the 1960s and the 1970s many evangelical women were influenced by the civil rights movement. Christian Feminists began writing and publishing articles that addressed reproductive rights as well as inequality in marriage and in the religious hierarchy. In response to these articles, groups such as the EWC or Evangelical Women's Caucus, and the ESA or Evangelicals for Societal Action were formed in order to create a social movement in the church towards equality, which was motivated by the Christian Feminist ideal that God created all people as equals.

Issues

Women in church leadership 

The division of Protestant belief systems into different denominations allowed for women to acquire far more leadership positions in the church, as certain denominations then had the freedom to advocate for female leadership. In both mainline and liberal branches of Protestant Christianity, women are ordained as clergy. Even some theologically conservative denominations, such as The Church of the Nazarene and Assemblies of God, ordain women as pastors. However, the Roman Catholic Church, the Eastern Orthodox Church, the Southern Baptist Convention (the largest Protestant denomination in the U.S.), as well as the Church of Jesus Christ of Latter-day Saints (LDS Church), and many churches in the American Evangelical movement prohibit women from entering clerical positions. Some Christian feminists believe that as women have greater opportunity to receive theological training, they will have greater influence on how scriptures are interpreted by those that deny women the right to become ministers.

Interpretations of gender based scriptures  

Many of the Christian ideals concerning gender stem from interpretations of the Bible. Christian feminists have often argued that the Bible is problematic, not because of the text itself, but because of the Christian scholars who have interpreted the scripture throughout time. An example of these inconsistencies can be found in the creation story of Adam and Eve; some Evangelicals believe that Adam and Eve were created at the same time, while others believe that Eve was made from the rib of Adam. There is also wide debate within many Christian denominations over the fault of Eve concerning the consumption of the forbidden fruit, and the entrance of sin into the world. Historically, a great deal of blame has been placed on Eve, but many Christian Feminists have worked to reframe the story, and shift the blame equally between both parties, as both partook of the fruit. The story of Adam and Eve is just one example of a text which Christian feminists believe is patriarchal in nature due to its interpretation. Some Christian Feminists made the decision to abandon direct scriptural use in their fight for equality, while others relied on verses that opposed patriarchal ideals, pointing out the inconsistencies within the Bible. The following passages act as examples of these inconsistencies.

 . "There is neither…male nor female for all are one in Christ Jesus."
 Deborah of the Old Testament was a prophetess and "judge of Israel"
 . The word translated "help" or "helper" is the same Hebrew word, "ēzer," which the Old Testament uses more than 17 times to describe the kind of help that God brings to His people in times of need; e.g., "Thou art my help (ēzer) and my deliverer," and "My help (ēzer) comes from the Lord." Never once in all these references is the word used to indicate subordination or servitude to another human being.
 . "To the woman he (God) said, 'I will greatly increase your pains in childbearing; in pain you shall bring forth children, yet your desire shall be for your husband, and he shall rule over you.
 . "But I suffer not a woman to teach, nor to usurp authority over the man, but to be in silence."
 . "For a man ought not to cover his head, since he is the image and glory of God, but woman is the glory of man. For man was not made from woman, but woman from man. Neither was man created for woman, but woman for man."
 . "The women should keep silent in the churches. For they are not permitted to speak, but should be in submission, as the Law also says."
 . "Wives, submit to your husbands, as is fitting in the Lord."
 . "Likewise, wives, be subject to your own husbands, so that even if some do not obey the word, they may be won without a word by the conduct of their wives."
 . "Wives, be subject to your husbands as you are to the Lord. For the husband is the head of the wife just as Christ is the head of the church, the body of which he is the Savior. Just as the church is subject to Christ, so also wives ought to be, in everything, to their husbands."

Reproduction, sexuality and religion 

Conservative religious groups are often at philosophical odds with many feminist and liberal religious groups over abortion and the use of birth control. Scholars like sociologist Flann Campbell have argued that conservative religious denominations tend to restrict male and female sexuality by prohibiting or limiting birth control use, and condemning abortion as sinful murder. Some Christian feminists (like Teresa Forcades) contend that a woman's "right to control her pregnancy is bounded by considerations of her own well-being" and that restricted access to birth control and abortion disrespect her God-given free will.

A number of socially progressive mainline Protestant denominations as well as certain Jewish organizations and the group Catholics for a Free Choice have formed the Religious Coalition for Reproductive Choice. The RCRC often works as a liberal feminist organization and in conjunction with other American feminist groups to oppose conservative religious denominations which, from their perspective, seek to suppress the natural reproductive rights of women.

In general, many Christian Feminist scholars hope to work towards a society in which female sexuality is not, in their opinion, condemned by the church, but acknowledged as a natural part of the human existence. During the Reformation, recognized theologians such as Martin Luther and John Calvin stressed the importance of chastity and marriage, leading to further repression of female sexuality within the Christian tradition. Many Christian Feminists have stated that men in powerful religious positions have often used the scriptures, and teachings from theologians such as Calvin and Luther to both dominate and repress women sexually, a problem which Christian Feminists believe needs to be solved immediately.

Feminine or gender-transcendent God 

Some Christian feminists believe that gender equality within the church cannot be achieved without rethinking the portrayal and understanding of God as a masculine being. The theological concept of Sophia, usually seen as replacing or synonymous with the Holy Spirit in the Trinity, is often used to fulfill this desire for symbols which reflect women's religious experiences. How Sophia is configured is not static, but usually filled with emotions and individual expression. For some Christian feminists, the Sophia concept is found in a search for women who reflect contemporary feminist ideals in both the Old and New Testament. Some figures used for this purpose include the Virgin Mary, Mary Magdalene, Eve, and Esther. Others see God as entirely gender-transcendent, or focus on the feminine aspects of God and Jesus. A female depiction of the Christ figure, known as Christa, recently arose in an attempt to allow for the power of the Christ figure to be applied to both the masculine and the feminine. Some Christian feminists use and promote gender-neutral or feminine language and imagery to describe God or Christ. Christian Feminists also call for a gender neutral reading of the Bible, as male pronouns are heavily used as compared to female pronouns throughout the text.  The United Church of Christ describes its New Century Hymnal, published in 1995, as "the only hymnal released by a Christian church that honors in equal measure both male and female images of God."

Feminist Theology 
There are a number of academic journals dedicated to promoting feminist theological scholarship. These include:

 Journal of Feminist Studies of Religion
 Women-Church Journal (1988-2007), co-editors: Elaine Lindsay and Erin White
 in God's image, produced by the Asian Women's Resource Centre for Culture and Theology
 Feminist Theology

Critiques of Christian Feminism

Roman Catholicism 
There have been multiple Popes, like Pope John Paul II and Pope Francis, who have referenced a type of Feminism in their addresses to the public. Pope Francis is quoted saying the “irreplaceable role of the woman in the family … [t]he gifts of -delicacy … which are a richness of the feminine spirit, represent a genuine force for the life of the family … without which the human vocation would be unrealizable." Some men and women took Pope Francis words as a "vivid hope" that woman will take a more prominent role in the Catholic Church. These same women and men also believe that "Radical Feminism" is the cause for the teachings of then Pope John Paul II to be viewed as negative, they also believe that Pope John Paul II was taking great strides, at least for his time, to include women in the church. These critics of modern-day feminism believe that the negativity is not pointed in the right direction for the women's place in the Roman Catholic church.

See also 

 Anti-pornography feminism
 Asian feminist theology
 Biblical patriarchy
 Christian egalitarianism
 Christian humanism
 Christianity and abortion
 Christian views of marriage
 Complementarianism
 Evangelical and Ecumenical Women's Caucus
 Feminist theology
 Gender roles in Christianity
 HerChurch
 Jewish feminism
 Liberation theology
 Mormon feminism
 Muslim feminism
 New feminism
 Ordination of women
 Political theology
 Progressive Christianity
 Religious feminism
 Sacred feminine
 Women in Church history
 Women in the Bible
The Woman's Bible
 Womanist theology

References

Further reading

External links 

 Christian feminist articles and books 
 Radio Interview with Dr. Rosemary Radford Ruether on Ecofeminism and Christianity, University of Toronto, 16 February 2007.

 
Christian theological movements
Christianity and women
Feminist theory
Liberation theology
Proponents of Christian feminism